Events in the year 2021 in Grenada.

Incumbents 

 Monarch: Elizabeth II
 Governor-General: Dame Cécile La Grenade
 Prime Minister: Keith Mitchell

Events 
Ongoing — COVID-19 pandemic in Grenada

 January 1 –  2021 New Year Honours

 November 19 – Argentina officially announces that it will donate 11,000 doses of the Oxford–AstraZeneca COVID-19 vaccine to Grenada.

Sports 

 Grenada at the 2020 Summer Olympics
 Grenada at the 2020 Summer Paralympics

References 

 
2020s in Grenada
Years of the 21st century in Grenada
Grenada
Grenada